Aishwarya Shah, known professionally as Ashwarya (stylised in all caps), is an Indian-Australian singer and songwriter. She signed to Jarrad Rogers' label Noize Recordings and subsequently released her debut single "Psycho Hole" on 2 July 2020. Her debut extended play, Nocturnal Hours, was released on 8 July 2021.

Career 
Ashwarya's singles "Psycho Hole" and "Biryani" were released in 2020, which were followed by her debut extended play, Nocturnal Hours, on 8 July 2021. She released the song "Can't Relate" on 17 August 2022.

Artistry

Musical style and influences
Shah lists musicians such as Rihanna, Kanye West, Travis Scott, Sufjan Stevens, Tyler, the Creator, and SZA as influences.

Discography

Extended plays

Singles

Awards and nominations

Music Victoria Awards
The Music Victoria Awards, are an annual awards night celebrating Victorian music. They commenced in 2005.

! 
|-
| 2021
| Ashwarya
| Best Breakthrough Act
| 
| 
|-

References

Australian people of Indian descent
Australian pop musicians
Australian contemporary R&B singers
Living people
1999 births